"Beautiful" is a song written and recorded by American alternative metal band 10 Years for their fourth album, Division, which is their second major release under Universal Records. It was released as the album's first single to iTunes and rock radio outlets in 2008.

Chart performance
"Beautiful" debuted on Billboard's Hot Mainstream Rock Tracks at number 34 for the issue date of February 23, 2008. It peaked at number 6, spending 26 weeks on the chart. The song has also charted on Billboard's Hot Modern Rock Tracks, peaking at number 14.

Music video
The music video for "Beautiful" premiered on April 21, 2008, at Universal Republic's video site and on YouTube a few days later. It depicts a celebrity (Rebecca Ginos) going inside her house due to the paparazzi invading and watching her every move, reminiscent of Lindsay Lohan, Paris Hilton, and Britney Spears.

Notes

External links

2008 singles
2008 songs
10 Years (band) songs
Songs written by Jesse Hasek
Song recordings produced by Rick Parashar
Hard rock ballads
Universal Records singles